Acatenango is a stratovolcano in Guatemala, close to the city of Antigua. The volcano has two peaks, Pico Mayor (Highest Peak) and Yepocapa (3,880 m) which is also known as Tres Hermanas (Three Sisters). Acatenango is joined with Volcán de Fuego and collectively the volcano complex is known as La Horqueta.

Description
The Fuego-Acatenango massif comprises a string of five or more volcanic vents along a north–south trend that is perpendicular to that of the Central American Volcanic Arc in Guatemala. From north to south, known centres of volcanism are Ancient Acatenango, Yepocapa, Pico Mayor de Acatenango, Meseta, and Fuego. Volcanism along the trend stretches back more than 200,000 years. Although many of the centres have been active contemporaneously, there is a general sequence of younger volcanism, from north to south along the trend.

This massive volcano complex towers more than 3,500 metres above the Pacific coastal plain to the south and 2,000 metres above the Guatemalan Highlands to the north. The volcano complex comprises remnants of multiple eruptive centres, which periodically have collapsed to form huge debris avalanches. The largest of these avalanches extended more than 50 kilometres from its source and covered more than 300 square kilometres.

Eruption history 
The only known historical eruptions of Acatenango volcano occurred in the 20th century, between 1924 and 1927 from just north of the summit peak (Pico Mayor) and again in December 1972 from the saddle between Yepocapa and Pico Mayor. These phreatic explosions generated ballistic volcanic bombs that fell near the summit craters and fine volcanic ash that fell up to 25 km away.

In prehistoric time, Acatenango has erupted explosively to form widespread fall deposits, hot pyroclastic flows and lava flows. There have been numerous eruptions during the past 80,000 years from vents along the massif. The most recent explosive eruptions of Acatenango occurred 1,900 years ago (Pico Mayor), 2,300 years ago (Pico Mayor) and about 5,000 years ago (Yepocapa). If such eruptions were to recur, many people and costly infrastructure would be at risk.

Economy 
The Acatenango Valley is a designated coffee-producing region of Anacafé.

Gallery

See also
List of volcanoes in Guatemala
Mountain peaks of North America
List of stratovolcanoes

References

External links

 
 Excerpts from: Vallance, et al., 2001, Volcano Hazards at Fuego and Acatenango, Guatemala: USGS Open-File Report 01-431
 

Sacatepéquez Department
Sierra Madre de Chiapas
Active volcanoes
Stratovolcanoes of Guatemala
Subduction volcanoes
Mountains of Guatemala
Volcano
Pleistocene stratovolcanoes
Holocene stratovolcanoes